Hashtnagar (Pashto: هشتنګر, more commonly known as اشنغر in Pashto) is one of the two constituent parts of the Charsadda District in Khyber Pakhtunkhwa. The name Hashtnagar is derived from the Sanskrit अष्टनगरम् Aṣṭanagaram, "eight towns", from Sanskrit aṣṭa, "eight" and नगर nagara, "settlement, locality, town". There was an unrelated town of the same name near Kabul in the 17th century. It was home to the Roshani Movement.
The descriptive was later influenced by the Persian هشت hasht, "eight". The etymology "Eight Towns", refers to the eight major settlements situated in this region. These are:

Chārsadda, Hashtnagar [Muhammadzai and Kheshgi]
Prang (the 1812 list groups Prang with Chārsadda)
Rajjar, Chārsadda
Sherpao, Chārsadda
Tangi, Chārsadda
Turangzai, Chārsadda
Umarzai, Chārsadda
Utmanzai, Chārsadda
Dargai, Chārsadda

History

Buddhist period
Hashtnagar is known for an early Buddhist statue. The name Hashtnagar is derived from the Sanskrit Aṣṭanagaram, aṣṭa meaning "eight" and nagaram meaning "town".

Modern era
In 1812 the Asiatick Society (Calcutta, India) described the Gujars of Afghanistan as brave, mainly pastoral, and numerous in Hashtnagar district. The Muhammadzai (Charsadda) and Kheshgi were also mentioned as powerful tribes in the area.

Media
A documentary, exploring the political and cultural life of Hashtnagar, has been made by Ammar Aziz which is the first ever film on the subject . It features the local artists and political activists and romanticizes the communist movement of the area.

Notable people
 Bacha Khan
 Major General Akbar Khan
 Abdul Wali Khan
 Abdul Ghani Khan
 Dr. Khan Sahib
 Lieutenant General Imran Ullah Khan
 Asfandyar Wali Khan
 Hayat Muhammad Khan Sherpao

See also
 Babrra massacre

References

External links
 
 
 
 

Charsadda District, Pakistan